The Valide Mosque (from ) is a historical mosque in Mytilene, on the island of Lesbos in Greece.

The mosque is located in the old Turkish quarter of the city, Epano Skala. According to its founder's inscription above its entrance, it was built in 1615, making it one of the oldest mosques in the island.

It is built of stone masonry, and comprises a single level, with a pitched roof. A stone-paved courtyard once existed with a marble fountain, accessed through a marble staircase. The interior decoration was in coloured frescos, which were covered by a dark colour after the Muslim population left the island. The Arabic-style minaret is constructed from red stone quarried in Ayvalık, and is almost entirely preserved apart from a portion of its top.

The building and its minaret were designated as protected monuments by the Greek Ministry of Culture in 1981, but have not been restored. In early 2018, 1.2 million euros were designated for restoration work of the building, under the supervision of the Lesbos Ephorate of Antiquities.

References

Buildings and structures in Mytilene
Former mosques in Greece
Ottoman mosques in Greece
17th-century mosques
Buildings and structures completed in 1615